Bob Martin (born c. 1953) is a Scottish-English male curler.

At the national level, he is a four-time English men's champion curler (1982, 1984, 1985, 1986).

Teams

Personal life
Martin is originally from Edinburgh. At the time of the 1985 World Championship, he was working in Abidjan, Ivory Coast as an accountant for an oil company. At the time of the 1987 Worlds, he was living in Fulham, and was married.

References

External links

  (look at "CIP-64")
  (look at "1973-74")

Living people
English male curlers
English curling champions
1950s births
Place of birth missing (living people)
Curlers from Edinburgh
English accountants
English expatriate sportspeople
People from Fulham
Sportspeople from London